Andrey Ivanovich Ivanov (Russian: Андрей Иванович Иванов; 1775, Moscow - 24 July 1848, Saint Petersburg) was a Russian painter in the Neo-Classical style who specialized in historical scenes.

Biography 
He was abandoned by his parents and was raised at the Moscow Orphanage. He was enrolled in the elementary courses at the Imperial Academy of Arts in 1782, and later studied with Grigory Ugryumov and Gabriel François Doyen, graduating in 1797. He began teaching there in 1798 and became an Academician in 1803. During this time, he was engaged in copying the old Italian masters and painting icons. In 1812 he was appointed a Professor for his painting of Prince Mstislav the Brave and the defeat of Rededya. In 1820, he painted the fresco "Minerva Hovering in the Sky" for the iron staircase at the Academy.

His painting "The Death of General Kulnev" angered Tsar Nicholas I when it was exhibited in 1830, apparently because it portrayed a controversial (and almost certainly apocryphal) moment from the incident; Kulnev's order to his allied officers to remove their insignia so the enemy wouldn't know that the Russian army was without a commander. As a result, Ivanov was removed from the Academy. A few years later, when Karl Briullov returned to Russia and was presented with a laurel wreath, he took it off his head and placed it on Ivanov's instead, as a sign of respect and appreciation.

Despite his forced retirement, Ivanov remained active as a painter and member of several artistic societies. He died of cholera. His grave in the Smolensk Cemetery has not survived. His son was the painter Alexander Andreyevich Ivanov.

Selected paintings

References

Further reading 
 S. V. Korovkevich, Андрей Иванович Иванов, Искусство, Moscow (1972).
 A.N. Savinov and A.I. Ivanov, Русское искусство… Первая половина 19 в. (Russian Art in the First Half of the Nineteenth Century), Moscow (1954).

External links

Russian painters
Russian male painters
History painters
1775 births
1848 deaths
Imperial Academy of Arts alumni
Awarded with a large gold medal of the Academy of Arts
Members of the Imperial Academy of Arts